Veebha Anand is an Indian actress known for her portrayal of Sugna Shyam Singh in Balika Vadhu, Kangana in Shree, Laxmi Angad Purohit in Sanskaar Laxmi, Subhadra in Mahabharat, Navya Naveli in Kaisi Yeh Yaariaan, and Ananya Shakti Thakur in &TV's Begusarai.

Early life 
Vibha Anand was born on 8 September 1995 in Dehradun, Uttarakhand. She has a younger sister named Sakshi Anand, a writer and brother named Ajeet Anand. She coming from a non-filmy background. Due to Numerology, She changed her name Veebha Anand from Vibha Anand. While this did not make any significant transformation in the pronunciation of her name, Veebha Anand replaced i with ee. She completed her schooling from Doon Presidency School, Uttarakhand.

Personal life 
Veebha Anand was in a releationship with TV actor Rohit Purohit. They met at the sets of their program Sanskaar Laxmi. After dating for some time, the couple decided to terminate this relationship and moved into their individual lives.

Career

Early career 
Veebha Anand started her journey of acting at a very young age of fifteen. Initially her journey was not easy as she had to struggle a lot but her father who supported her throughout her struggling phase. She joined in famous acting academy Kreating Charekters. She is the student of famous actors Samar Jai Singh and Roopesh Thapliyal. In 2008 after months of auditions, she got the opportunity to make her debut with television serial Balika Vadhu as Sugna.

Early acting career (2008–2013) 
Veebha started her television career with the show Balika Vadhu in 2008, broadcast on Colors TV. Anand rose to fame for portraying the role of Sugna Shyam Singh. Her performance in the serial was loved by everyone making her the household name and she got the popularity and nominated for the Indian Telly Awards for Best Actress in a Supporting Role and Indian Television Academy Awards for Best Actress in a Supporting Role.

Next she played a negative role in ZEE TV's supernatural drama show Shree. She acted as Namrata in Sukh by Chance in 2009. 

She debuted movie with the Thriller Film Stoneman Murders  as Sanjay's daughter.

She played lead role in ZEE TV’s Sanskaar Laxmi as Laxmi Angad Purohit opposite Rohit Purohit and Shakti Arora.

Anand played a supporting role in Bollywood Film Isi Life Me in 2011.

Later she worked in several popular television shows such as Fear Files: Darr Ki Sacchi Tasvirein, Kairi-Rishta Khatta Meetha, Yeh Hai Aashiqui and Crime Patrol.

Establishing herself as a popular actress (2013–present) 
She was recognized for her role as Subhadra in Star Plus’s mythological TV seriesMahabharat opposite Shaheer Sheikh .

She appeared for an episodic appearance in MTV Webbed and Akbar Birbal.

She played Navya Naveli on MTV's youth show Kaisi Yeh Yaariaan opposite Abhishek Malik and Ayaz Ahmed. She played a teenage girl from a small town who get betrayed by her boyfriend and gets pregnant. After betrayal she becomes a stronger persona.

Then She appeared as Ananya Shakti Thakur in Popular Soap Opera Begusarai opposite Vishal Aditya Singh, Ankit Gupta, Parichay Sharma, Manish Naggdev and Mukul Raj Singh. Her character in the Begusarai inspired from Mahabharat's Draupadi.

Anand came for a cameo appearance in Karmaphal Dataa Shani .

Anand made her web debut in the thriller Web Series Twistted 2 along with Nia Sharma and Rrahul Sudhir. She play a vital role in the series, a crime reporter. Anand also featured in Web Comedy Romantic Film Yours Truly Roohani opposite Rishi Saxena .

Anand featured in the film Hum Chaar as Savita. Anand came for an episodic role in Laal Ishq .

In 2020, Anand featured in the episodic web series Manohar Kahaniyan opposite Ankit Gupta as a new bride in the house.

In the same year 2020, Anand featured the tamil language film Mookuthi Amman as Dharani. She first time acted on the other language films.

In 2021, She played prostitute in the web film Rajnigandha along with Rajesh Sharma. Rajnigandha is a heart-wrenching story of a father and daughter.

She currently seen in the Disney+ Hotstar's horror-thriller web series Ankahi Ansuni opposite Paresh Pahuja.The series follows the story of a demoted young police inspector of UP police and transferred to a fictional sleepy town Jhaagi, notorious for having numerous unsolved mysterious cases. She will be seen playing the role of a Police constable.

Television

Theatre play

Web series

Movies

Short films

Web films

Musical videos

Awards and nominations

See also 
 List of Indian television actresses

References

External links 
 

21st-century Indian actresses
1995 births
Indian television actresses
Living people